Branicki may refer to:

 Two aristocratic families of Poland (plural family name: Braniccy)
 Branicki family (Gryf)
 Branicki family (Korczak)
 Individuals bearing Branicki surname
Franciszek Ksawery Branicki
Jan Klemens Branicki
Władysław Grzegorz Branicki
 Places
 Branicki Palace, Białystok
 Branicki's Palace, Warsaw

See also